Castleford is a town within the City of Wakefield, West Yorkshire, England. It had a population of 45,106 at a 2021 population estimate. Historically in the West Riding of Yorkshire, to the north of the town centre the River Calder joins the River Aire and the Aire and Calder Navigation. It is located north east of Wakefield, north of Pontefract and south east of Leeds. Castleford is the largest town in the Wakefield district after Wakefield itself.

The town is the site of a Roman settlement. Within the historical Municipal Borough of Castleford are the suburbs of Airedale, Cutsyke, Ferry Fryston, Fryston Village, Glasshoughton, Half Acres, Hightown, Lock Lane, Townville, Wheldale and Whitwood.

Castleford is home to the rugby league Super League team Castleford Tigers.

History

Castleford's history dates back to Roman times, archaeological evidence points to modern day Castleford being built upon a Roman army settlement which was called Lagentium (thought to mean 'The Place of the Swordsmen'). Roman funeral urns have been found in modern-day Castleford, giving further evidence to this theory. A Roman milestone was unearthed in Beancroft Road, now believed to be in Leeds City Museum.

Queen's Park in Castleford provides evidence of Roundhouses used by the Anglo Saxons. This was a strategic area due to the views of the entire settlement. The history of the area includes Oliver Cromwell's encampment in nearby Knottingley and Ferrybridge (originally thought to be in Castleford itself) whilst his forces laid siege to Pontefract Castle.

In the 19th century, Castleford became a boomtown with the population growing from 1,000 to 14,000 as collieries opened around the town; however, these collieries closed in the 20th century. Ferrybridge Power Station and Kellingley Colliery have also closed (in 2015 and 2016 respectively) and used to employ Castleford residents. The newer warehouses and distribution centres in Glasshoughton have brought in many new jobs to the area.

In 2008 Grand Designs presenter Kevin McCloud and Channel 4 led a community regeneration scheme to redevelop Castleford.

In February 2017 Castleford Swimming Pool closed. A new modern leisure facility including a swimming pool is proposed for nearby Pontefract Park.

Economy

Burberry, the retailer and designer label, has a factory in the town, plans were proposed to close this once a new facility was built in Leeds. However these plans were put on hold in 2016 and the factory is due to remain in the town for the foreseeable future. A large Nestlé factory, which produced Toffee Crisp and After Eights for 40 years, closed in 2012 and demolition starting in 2014 to make way for housing. Castleford has previously been home to Dunsford and Wesley Textiles, which at peak business times had three factories in Castleford which have all since ceased production.

Castleford had potteries from the early 18th century until 1961, notably the Castleford Pottery (1790-1820) of David Dunderdale, which gave its name to "Castleford-type" stonewares.

Governance

Castleford was established as an urban district, in the administrative county of the West Riding of Yorkshire in 1894 under the Local Government Act 1894, with an urban district council. Whitwood and Glasshoughton were added to the district in the 1930s. The urban district was incorporated as a municipal borough in 1955.

Following the Local Government Act 1972, the Municipal Borough of Castleford was abolished on 1 April 1974; it then became an unparished area of the City of Wakefield, a metropolitan borough in West Yorkshire. Castleford is now controlled by Wakefield Council. Three electoral wards cover the town: Airedale and Ferry Fryston; Altofts and Whitwood; and Castleford Central and Glasshoughton.

Amenities and entertainment

The town contains the Junction 32 multi-store outlet shopping village and the Xscape leisure complex, both in the Glasshoughton suburb at the south of the town. Within Xscape is the large Snozone, which used to have Britain's largest indoor real snow slope; this was later edged out by Chillfactore in Manchester. It is also home to Frankie & Benny's and Nando's restaurants. It is also home to a 14-screen Cineworld, which underwent a refit in 2018 and is now home to a 4DX screen and a Screen X. 

Castleford has an open and an indoor market, a shopping centre on Carlton Street and a retail park; in addition, Asda, Morrisons, Aldi and Co-operative supermarkets are located there.

In December 2013, the Castleford Forum Museum, a library and heritage museum, opened in a new building. The town's library had been in temporary accommodation for two years, while the old site was redeveloped. The existing frontage was kept, while the building further back was demolished.  A new three-floor building was then constructed.

The town centre has public houses, bars and social clubs, although the number of these has declined in recent years  with leisure becoming focused on the Xscape complex. In 2000, three nightclubs were situated in the town centre; today, none remain.

Media
The local newspaper is a weekly called Pontefract and Castleford Express.

Transport

Roads
It has other A roads that criss-cross the town and provide access to Junction 31 on the same motorway.

Waterways
The rivers Aire and Calder have a confluence just north-west of the town and also feed the Aire and Calder Navigation. Whilst it is an industrial waterway, it also hosts tourism with moorings on the Castleford Cut of the Navigation.

Railways

Castleford railway station is situated on both the Hallam and Pontefract lines; these lines connect the town directly with Leeds, Barnsley, Goole, Pontefract and Sheffield.  All trains arrive from the west and leave in that same direction. In January 2021, the station was completely revamped, providing a modern waiting facility, sheltered cycle parking and changes to the car park layout.

Train services used to travel eastwards to York, via Burton Salmon, but passenger workings ceased in 1970 with the section retained for freight workings only. Castleford also had a second service to Leeds that left the station eastwards and swung north onto the former Castleford–Garforth line, which saw 
services calling at Ledston and Kippax, before arriving in Garforth and continuing to Leeds. 

The Glasshoughton area of the town is served by its own railway station, which is situated one stop beyond Castleford on the Pontefract line.

Buses
In 2016, a new £6 million bus station was opened adjacent to the railway station to allow an integrated travel site for the 12,000 people using the bus station per day.

Local services are provided primarily by Arriva Yorkshire,  but also by Globe Holidays (Barnsley) and Ross Travel.  Routes link Castleford with Leeds, Pontefract and Wakefield.

Education

The town's primary schools for young children are Wheldon Infant School, Castleford Park Junior, Smawthorne Henry Moore, Townville Infant School, Airedale Juniors, Oyster Park Primary, Fairburn View Primary, Three Lane Ends Academy, Ackton Pastures and Half Acres.

Castleford's secondary schools for children aged 11–16 are Castleford Academy and Airedale Academy. 

The town has a small further and higher education college on the Castleford Campus of Wakefield College in Glasshoughton.

Sport

Rugby League

Castleford is a rugby league town. The local team, Castleford Tigers was formed in 1926, Castleford was one of the twelve founder members of Super League when the new league format was introduced in 1996. The 'Tigers' nickname and logo were introduced in 1992 and the clubs honours include four Challenge Cup and one Super League leaders shield.

The club have been based at Wheldon Road since 1927. Castleford also has two other lower league rugby league teams, Castleford Lock Lane and Castleford Panthers.

Rugby league in the town was originally represented by Castleford, unrelated to Castleford RUFC, who did not participate in The schism in English rugby and still exist, nor were they predecessors of the current Castleford Tigers who were founded in 1926. The original Castleford rugby league club played in the Northern Union (Rugby Football League) from 1896–97 to 1905–06, and it had one player named Isaac Cole who won a cap for England in 1906 against Other Nationalities.

Motorcycle sport
From June 1979 to July 1980, Castleford had its own Speedway racing team, The Kings, based at the Castleford Whitwood Stadium. The circuit was 202 yards and the team never entered the league – only challenge matches were staged.

In the 1960s, motorcycle scrambling used to take place on the north side of the hill at Queens Park. This was often featured on the BBC's Grandstand sports programme on Saturday afternoons and was commentated upon by Murray Walker.

Football
Glasshoughton Welfare play in the Northern Counties East League, Fryston Colliery Welfare were members of this league until they left in 1991 due to ground grading problems. In the 1920s Castleford Town played in the Midland League alongside clubs such as Doncaster Rovers, Chesterfield, Scunthorpe United, Halifax Town, Leeds United (for 1919–20 season only), Lincoln City and Mansfield Town. This league also contained the reserve sides of Sheffield Wednesday, Barnsley, Nottingham Forest, Grimsby Town and Hull City. In 1920 Castleford reached the 2nd round of the FA Cup, losing 2–3 at Bradford Park Avenue. Castleford played at Wheldon Road – when they shut down the ground was taken over by the rugby league team.

Greyhound racing
Castleford hosted two greyhound tracks both of which are no longer in existence. The first was in Whitwood and held racing from 1939 until 2001. The second track was the slightly larger 1,500 capacity Castleford Sports Stadium located east of Lock Lane sitting on the north bank of the River Aire.

Notable people

People born in Castleford:
Paul J. Anderson (born 1971), rugby footballer
Mark Aston (born 1967), rugby coach
Arthur "Bruss" Atkinson (1906-1963), rugby footballer
Dennis Baddeley (1921-2006), rugby footballer
Mark D. Bailey (born 1960), professor
George W. Banks (c.1909-????), rugby footballer
John Beaman (born 1951), politician
Ben Blackmore (born 1993), rugby footballer
Peter Broughton (born 1935), cricketer
Sonia Burgess (1947-2010), immigration lawyer
Mark Burns-Williamson (born 1964), politician
Wilf Burrows (1902-1985), footballer
Abi Burton (born 2000), rugby player
Harold "Harry" Burton (died 2009), rugby footballer
Mark Byford (born 1958), deputy director-general of BBC
Fred Carter, rugby footballer
James "Sticks" Clare (born 1991), rugby footballer
Daryl Clark (born 1993), rugby footballer
Gary Cooper (1938-2019), rugby footballer
Matt Crowther (born 1974), rugby footballer
Will Dagger (born 1999), rugby footballer
Jonathan Davies (born 1991), rugby footballer
Les Dyl (1952-2022), rugby footballer
Cecil Eastwood (1894-1968), footballer
Greg Eden (born 1990), rugby footballer
Derek Edwards (c.1943-2020), rugby footballer
Brett Ferres (born 1986), rugby footballer
Richard Foulkes (born 1909), footballer
Tommy Gale (1895-1976), footballer
Sammy Gledhill (1913-1994), footballer
John A. Harman (born 1950), politician
Jack Hebden (born 1900), footballer
Jonny Hepworth (born 1989), rugby footballer
Keith Hepworth (born c.1942), rugby footballer
Gary Hetherington (born 1954), rugby footballer
Thomas Holmes (born 1996), rugby footballer
John Illingworth (1904-1964), footballer
Gill Isles (born 1972), TV producer
Neil James (1961-2014), rugby footballer
Kryan Johnson (born 1994), rugby footballer
John Kear (born 1954), rugby coach
Stan Kielty (1925-2008), rugby footballer
Brad Knowles (born 1993), rugby footballer
Shaun Le Roux (born 1986), squash player
Christopher "Cliff" Lethbridge (born 1963), cricketer
Joyce Lishman (1947-2021), professor
Walter "Ginger" Lynch (1896-c.1923), footballer
Dominic Maloney (born 1987), rugby footballer
Lester Marshall (1902-1956), footballer
Nathan Massey (born 1989), rugby footballer
Peter Meakin (born 1942), journalist
Roger Millward (1947-2016), rugby footballer
Henry Moore (1898-1986), artist
Viv Nicholson (1936-2015), expatriate
Julian Norton (born 1972), veterinary surgeon
Steve Norton (born 1951), rugby player
Danny Orr (born 1978), rugby coach
Stephen Payne (born 1975), footballer
Daryl Peach (born 1972), pool player
Mervyn Pike (1918-2004), politician
Harry Poole (1935-1977), rugby footballer
Gary "Slogger" Price (born 1961), rugby footballer
Colin Roberts (1933-2017), footballer
Donald Robinson (1932-2017), rugby footballer
Ash Robson (born 1995), rugby footballer
Nicky Saxton (born 1984), rugby footballer
Waen Shepherd (born 1971), composer
Chris Smith (born 1975), rugby footballer 
Harry W. Smith (1886-1955), cricketer
Tony "Casper" Smith (born 1970), rugby player
Reginald Soar (1893-1971), flying ace
Anthony Starks (1873-1952), rugby footballer
Gary Stephens (born 1952), rugby footballer
Harry Street (1927-2002), rugby footballer
Gay Taylor (1896-1970), writer
John "Jack" Taylor (1877-1951), rugby player
Bob Tomlinson, footballer
Andrew Townsley (born 1952), cricketer
David Treasure (born 1950), rugby footballer
Calum Turner (born 1997), rugby footballer
John "Willie" Ward (1873-1939), rugby footballer
John "Johnny" Ward (1940/41-2019), rugby footballer
Liam Watts (born 1990), rugby footballer
Noel Wilders (born 1975), boxer
Kyle Wood (born 1989), rugby footballer
Val Wood, author
Martyn Woolford (born 1985), footballer

See also
 Listed buildings in Castleford
 Trinity Methodist Church, Castleford

References

External links

 
Towns in West Yorkshire
Unparished areas in West Yorkshire
Geography of the City of Wakefield